Head Up High is the eighth studio album by the British band Morcheeba, released on 14 October 2013. In 2014 it was awarded a double silver certification from the Independent Music Companies Association, which indicated sales of at least 40,000 copies throughout Europe.

Track listing

Charts

References

External links
 Morcheeba official website

2013 albums
Morcheeba albums
PIAS Recordings albums